Erected in 1921, the Poulton-le-Fylde War Memorial is located in the English market town of Poulton-le-Fylde, Lancashire. A Grade II listed structure, it stands in a small cobbled area at the north end of Market Place, having been moved from nearby Queen’s Square in 1979. Made of granite, it consists of a pillar with an octagonal foot, and a ball finial surmounted by a wheel-head cross.  The pillar is on a square plinth on an octagonal step.  On the plinth is a timber plaque with a coat of arms, a bronze plaque with an inscription, and further plaques recording the names of those lost in the World Wars and another conflict.

References

External links
Memorial, Poulton le Fylde – Imperial War Museums

Buildings and structures in Poulton-le-Fylde
Grade II listed buildings in Lancashire
Cenotaphs in the United Kingdom
British military memorials and cemeteries
1921 sculptures
Stone sculptures in the United Kingdom
Outdoor sculptures in England
Monuments and memorials in England
World War I memorials in England
World War II memorials in England
1921 establishments in England